The 2020 season was the Seattle Seahawks' 45th in the National Football League (NFL) and their 11th season under head coach Pete Carroll. With a win over the Washington Football Team in Week 15, the Seahawks made the playoffs for the third consecutive year. With a Week 17 win over the San Francisco 49ers, they improved upon their 11–5 record from the previous season. For the first time in franchise history, the Seahawks started 5–0. After a Week 16 win over the Los Angeles Rams, the Seahawks clinched the NFC West title for the first time since 2016.

However, in the Wild Card round, the Seahawks were defeated by the rival Rams 30–20. This was the Seahawks first home playoff loss in the Wilson/Carroll era and their first home playoff loss since 2004, which also came against the Rams.

On November 19, 2020, CenturyLink Field was renamed Lumen Field.

On February 6, 2021, Russell Wilson was named Walter Payton NFL Man of the Year, the second Seahawk to earn the honor, after Steve Largent.

The Seahawks were the only team in the league to not have a player test positive for COVID-19 during the season. Due to the pandemic, home games were played without fans in attendance. Additionally, six of Seattle's eight road games were played without fans.

Draft

Notes
 The Seahawks traded their original second-round selection (No. 59) and a compensatory third-round selection (No. 101) to the New York Jets in exchange for the Jets' second-round selection (No. 48).
 The Seahawks acquired an additional second-round selection (No. 64) as part of a trade that sent defensive end Frank Clark to the Kansas City Chiefs. This selection was traded to the Carolina Panthers in exchange for the Panthers' third-round selection (No. 69) and a fifth-round selection (No. 148).
 The Seahawks traded their original third-round selection (No. 91), along with linebackers Jacob Martin and Barkevious Mingo to the Houston Texans in exchange for defensive end Jadeveon Clowney.
 The Seahawks traded their original fifth-round selection (No. 172) to the Detroit Lions in exchange for safety Quandre Diggs and the Lions' 2021 seventh-round selection.
 The Seahawks acquired a new fifth-round selection (No. 162) in a trade that sent tight end Nick Vannett to the Pittsburgh Steelers.
 The Seahawks traded their original sixth-round selection (No. 206) to the Jacksonville Jaguars in exchange for a 2019 seventh-round selection.
 The Seahawks traded their seventh-round selection (No. 241) to the New England Patriots in exchange for tight end Jacob Hollister.

Staff
On September 11, Brian Schneider left the team due to personal reasons

Final roster

Preseason
The Seahawks' preseason schedule was announced on May 7, but was later cancelled due to the COVID-19 pandemic.

Regular season

Schedule
The Seahawks' 2020 schedule was announced on May 7.

Note: Intra-division opponents are in bold text.

Game summaries

Week 1: at Atlanta Falcons

Week 2: vs. New England Patriots

In a competitive game on primetime, the Seahawks pulled ahead by the third quarter but the game was decided on the final play; the Patriots had driven to a 1st-and-goal on Seattle's 1-yard line, but in a reversal of fate from Super Bowl XLIX, the Seahawks defense was able to stuff a rushing play from Patriots quarterback Cam Newton for no gain on the next play. As the Patriots were out of timeouts, the Seahawks managed to hold on for a thrilling win, earning their second straight 2–0 start. This game had to be monitored the entire week due to the bad air quality in the city thanks to fires across Washington and Oregon.

Week 3: vs. Dallas Cowboys

Russell Wilson continued to play at an MVP-caliber level, throwing 5 touchdowns. The Seahawks would once again win a close game after intercepting Cowboys quarterback Dak Prescott in the endzone.

Week 4: at Miami Dolphins

This was the Seahawks' first win in Miami since 1996, when they were part of the AFC West. It also gave Russell Wilson his first win in the state of Florida.

Week 5: vs. Minnesota Vikings

With this win, Seattle improved to 5–0, which was also their first time in doing so in franchise history. Russell Wilson also improved to 7–0 in his career against the Vikings.

Week 7: at Arizona Cardinals

Seattle's unbeaten bid came to an end with their first loss in Arizona since the 2012 season. While Russell Wilson finished with 388 yards and 3 touchdown passes to Tyler Lockett, he also finished with three interceptions, including a costly one in overtime to Cardinals rookie linebacker Isaiah Simmons that eventually set up the decisive field goal by Zane Gonzalez. The Seahawks compiled 572 total yards of offense, the most by a losing team all season. Seattle dropped to 5–1 on the season, but still led the NFC West. This was also the Seahawks' first loss under Russell Wilson when leading by 4 or more points at halftime.

Week 8: vs. San Francisco 49ers

The Seahawks returned home after their overtime loss at Arizona, and rebounded with a dominant win over the arch-rival San Francisco 49ers. Russell Wilson finished 27/37 with 261 yards passing and four touchdown passes, including two to DK Metcalf, who also finished with 12 catches and 161 receiving yards. With the 37–27 win, the Seahawks improved to 6–1. This was the last Seattle home game in which the name "CenturyLink Field" was used. After 9 years of using the stadium name, CenturyLink rebranded to Lumen Technologies, effectively changing the name to "Lumen Field".

Week 9: at Buffalo Bills

The Buffalo Bills proved to be too much for the Seahawks to handle, as Buffalo's offense tore up Seattle's struggling defense behind 415 passing yards from Josh Allen. While the Seahawks would mount a comeback later in the game, pulling within seven points in the third quarter, they never led, and the Bills pulled away in the fourth. The 44–34 loss dropped Seattle to 6–2 on the season, and the 44 points surrendered were the most in the Pete Carroll era.

Week 10: at Los Angeles Rams

Week 11: vs. Arizona Cardinals

Seattle's rushing attack was bolstered by the return of Carlos Hyde from injury, racking up 165 yards. Conversely, the Seahawks' much-maligned defense held Arizona's league-leading rushing offense to 57 yards, over 110 yards below its season average. The same day as the game, CenturyLink Field was renamed Lumen Field.

Week 12: at Philadelphia Eagles

Week 13: vs. New York Giants
With the shocking loss, the Seahawks dropped to 8–4 and picked up their final loss of the season. This is also the only time during the regular season where the Seahawks lost a game at home.

Week 14: vs. New York Jets

Week 15: at Washington Football Team

Despite a close-scoring game, the Seahawks held on to win to clinch a playoff berth. Seattle took sole possession of first place in the division with the Rams' surprising loss to the then-winless New York Jets later that day.

Week 16: vs. Los Angeles Rams

With the win, the Seahawks clinched the NFC West title for the first time since 2016. They won all three home games against their NFC West opponents for the first time since 2014 and finished 7–1 at home in the regular season, which is also their best home record since 2016.

Week 17: at San Francisco 49ers

Trying to take the first round bye away from the Packers and Saints, the Seahawks did win to get a chance at a bye, but due to the Packers beating the Bears and the Saints' win against Carolina, the Hawks were relegated to the 3rd seed.

Standings

Division

Conference

Postseason

Schedule

Game summaries

NFC Wild Card Playoffs: vs. (6) Los Angeles Rams

Notes

References

External links
 

Seattle
Seattle Seahawks seasons
Seattle Seahawks
Seattle Seahawks
NFC West championship seasons